Golden Eye is an international festival for movie and TV camera operators. The festival's main goal is to motivate camera operators and others in the movie-TV industry, and support their professional development. The festival is a project of International Foundation for Innovative Technologies (IFIT) and was founded by Zurab Gegenava in 2009. 
All the works submitted to the "Golden Eye" are selected by an international jury. The Grand Prize – "Golden Eye" is awarded for the best camerawork.

History
For the first time on October 20–23, 2009 the International Festival of Movie and TV Cameramen "Golden Eye" was held in Tbilisi.  The Festival attracted lot of interest in Georgia, as well as throughout the world and became an annual festival.

In 2009, a photo exhibition dedicated to 125 years anniversary of the first Georgian cameraman  Aleksandre Dighmelov – “Aleksandre Dighmelov 125” took place in the frames of the festival.

In October 2010, Golden Eye was hosted by the cultural center “Muza” in Tbilisi. Participants of the festival included TV and movie cameramen from Azerbaijan, Armenia, Russia, Ukraine, Belarus, Estonia, the United States, Germany, the Netherlands, Spain, Croatia, Brazil, India, Pakistan and Austria.

On October 22, 2011, the Festival was held in Batumi, Georgia. Special guests of the festival were: Hiro Narita; Phil Parmet - Cameramen of "Four rooms" and "Grindhouse" by Quentin Tarantino, member of "Local 600"- International Cinematographers Guild. Jonathan Abrams - one of the Cameramen of "AVATAR", camera operator of "SOC".

On 16–18 October 2014, the Festival was held at Tbilisi Event Hall in Tbilisi. Golden Eye also hosted the 1st International Exhibition of Broadcast Equipment.

The exhibition was opened by the president of the Assembly of European Regions, Hande Özsan Bozatlı, who was a special guest in Georgia.

Events
The festival hosts an array of different events:

Presentations of the equipment manufacturing companies
The festival is annually visited by representatives of the leading manufacturer companies, who host seminars and presentations for festival guests and introduce them to the latest trends.

Masterclasses from special guests

The festival is annually visited by specifically invited specialists, who host master classes about various topics for both amateur and professional camera operators.

Open screenings of Submitted Works 

Open screenings of nominated works are held annually, giving the visitors the opportunity to assess submitted works.

International Exhibition of Broadcasting Equipment 

In 2014, in the frames of the "Golden Eye" the 1st International Exhibition of Broadcasting Equipment took place, which was the first throughout the region. Leading broadcasting equipment manufacturer companies participated in the exhibition:  Sony, Canon, Avid, Innovator, Broadview Software, Evertz, Fujifilm, JVC, Lawo, Linear Acoustic, Litepanels, Monarch, Panasonic, RTS, Sachtler, and Snell.

The exhibition gives the opportunity to interested individuals to have direct contact with the representatives of the companies, and to receive information about latest trends and new products.

The exhibition was opened by the president of the Assembly of European Regions, Hande Ozsan Bozatli, who was a special guest in Georgia.

References 
 Festival "Golden Eye"
 “Golden Eye” Festival of movie and TV cameramen
 First international broadcasting equipment

Culture in Tbilisi
Awards for best cinematography
Film festivals in Asia
Film festivals in Europe
Festivals in Georgia (country)
Autumn events in Georgia (country)